Mantasoa Dam is a buttress dam on the Varahina-North River, a tributary of the Ikopa River, near Mantasoa in the Analamanga Region of Madagascar. The dam was constructed by French contractors between 1937 and 1938. Water released from the dam supplies a regulated flow to hydroelectric power station at the Antelomita Dams downstream. A saddle dam on the north side of the Mantosoa reservoir regulates water flow into the Mandraka River for the Mandraka Dam downstream.

See also
Tsiazompaniry Dam – on the Varahina South River

References

Dams in Madagascar
Analamanga
Buttress dams
Dams completed in 1938
20th-century architecture in Madagascar